CCAN may refer to:
 Cambridgeshire Community Archive Network, a community-based local history network for Cambridgeshire
 Chesapeake Climate Action Network
 Comprehensive C Archive Network, an archive for the C programming language
 Nottingham Contemporary art centre (formerly known as Centre for Contemporary Art Nottingham)